"Liquid Swords" is a song by American rapper and Wu-Tang Clan member GZA. It is the second single and title track of his second studio album (1995). The song contains background vocals from RZA, who also produced the song.

Background and composition
The song opens with sampled dialogue from the film Shogun Assassin. It also samples "Mercy, Mercy, Mercy" and "Groovin'" by Willie Mitchell. In an interview with Wax Poetics, GZA spoke about the song's composition: 
This track is just braggadocios. It isn't meant to stand for anything. I'm talking about my skills and how I'm better than the rest. Usually I take a beat home and write to it for a few days, but it wasn't like that with this track. I think RZA played the beat for me and I just spit to it right there. The hook was actually a routine from around '84 that me RZA and Ol' Dirty would do: "When the emcees came, to live out the name." Just like that.

Charts

References

1995 singles
1995 songs
Geffen Records singles
GZA songs
Song recordings produced by RZA
Songs written by RZA